Juliana Rimane (born 22 January 1959 in Kourou, French Guiana) is a politician from French Guiana who was elected to the French National Assembly in 2002.

References 

French Guianan politicians
French people of French Guianan descent
French Guianan women in politics
1959 births
Living people
People from Kourou
21st-century French women politicians
Women members of the National Assembly (France)
Deputies of the 12th National Assembly of the French Fifth Republic